Memento is a 2000 American neo-noir psychological thriller film written and directed by Christopher Nolan, based on the  short story "Memento Mori" by his brother Jonathan Nolan, which was later published in 2001. The film stars Guy Pearce as Leonard Shelby, a man who suffers from anterograde amnesia, resulting in short-term memory loss and the inability to form new memories. He searches for the people who attacked him, raped and killed his wife, using an elaborate system of Polaroid photographs, handwritten notes, and tattoos to track information he won't remember. Carrie-Anne Moss and Joe Pantoliano co-star in the film.

The film's non-linear narrative is presented as two different sequences of scenes interspersed during the film: a series in black-and-white that is shown chronologically, and a series of color sequences shown in reverse order (simulating for the audience the mental state of the protagonist). The two sequences meet at the end of the film, producing one complete and cohesive narrative.

Memento had its premiere at the 57th Venice International Film Festival on September 5, 2000, and was released in the United States on March 16, 2001, by Newmarket. The film was acclaimed by critics, who praised its nonlinear structure and motifs of memory, perception, grief, and self-deception, and it earned $40 million over its $9 million budget. Memento received numerous accolades, including nominations for Best Original Screenplay and Best Film Editing at the 74th Academy Awards. In 2017, the United States Library of Congress deemed the film "culturally, historically, or aesthetically significant" and selected it for preservation in the National Film Registry.

Plot
The film starts with a Polaroid photograph of a dead man. As the sequence plays backward, the photo reverts to its undeveloped state, entering the camera before the man is shot in the head. The film then continues, alternating between black-and-white and color sequences.

The black-and-white sequences begin with Leonard Shelby, a former insurance investigator, in a motel room speaking to an unseen and unknown caller. Leonard has anterograde amnesia and is unable to store recent memories, the result of an attack by two men. Leonard explains that he killed the attacker who raped and strangled his wife Catherine, but a second clubbed him and escaped. The police did not accept that there was a second attacker, but Leonard believes the attacker's name is "John G" or "James G". Leonard investigates using notes, Polaroid photos, and tattoos to keep track of the information he discovers. Leonard recalls Sammy Jankis, another anterograde amnesiac, from his insurance industry days. After tests confirmed Sammy's inability to learn tasks through repetition, Leonard believed that his condition was at best psychological (and perhaps faked) and turned down his insurance claim. Sammy's distraught wife repeatedly asked Sammy to administer her insulin shots for her diabetes, hoping he would remember and stop himself from giving her a fatal overdose. However, Sammy continued to administer the injections, and his wife died.

The color sequences are shown reverse-chronologically. In the story's chronology, Leonard self-directively gets a tattoo of John G's license plate. Finding a note in his clothes, he meets Natalie, a bartender who resents Leonard because he wears the clothes and drives the car of her boyfriend, Jimmy Grantz. After understanding Leonard's condition, she uses it to get Leonard to drive a man named Dodd out of town and offers to run the license plate as a favor. Meanwhile, Leonard meets with a contact, Teddy, who helps with Dodd, but warns about Natalie. Leonard finds that he had previously annotated his Polaroid of Teddy, warning himself not to trust him. Natalie provides Leonard with the driver's license for a John Edward Gammell, Teddy's full name. Confirming Leonard's information on "John G" and his warnings, Leonard drives Teddy to an abandoned building, leading to the opening where he shoots him.

In the final black-and-white sequence, prompted by the caller, Leonard meets with Teddy, an undercover officer, who has found Leonard's "John G", Jimmy, and directs Leonard to the abandoned building. When Jimmy arrives, Leonard strangles him fatally and takes a Polaroid photo of the body. As the photo develops, the black-and-white transitions to the final color sequence. Leonard swaps clothes with Jimmy, hearing him whisper "Sammy". As Leonard has only told Sammy's story to those he has met, he suddenly doubts Jimmy's role in his wife's murder. Teddy arrives and asserts that Jimmy was John G, but when Leonard is undeterred, Teddy says that he helped him kill the real attacker a year ago, and he has been using Leonard ever since. Teddy points out that since the name "John G" is common, Leonard will cyclically forget and begin his search again and that even Teddy himself has a "John G" name. Further, Teddy says that Sammy's story is Leonard's own story, a memory Leonard has repressed to escape feelings of guilt.

After hearing Teddy confess all of this, Leonard burns the photograph of dead Jimmy and of himself right after killing the real attacker a year ago, pointing to his chest where he would get a tattoo to document his successful revenge. In a monologue, Leonard explains that he is willing to lie to himself in order to get justice against anyone who has wronged him. He, therefore, targets Teddy by ordering a tattoo of Teddy's license plate number and writing a note to himself that Teddy is not to be trusted so that he will mistake Teddy for John G and kill him. Leonard drives off in Jimmy's car, confident that, despite this lie, he will retain enough awareness of the world to know that his actions have consequences.

Cast

Film structure

The film is structured with two timelines: color sequences are alternated with black-and-white sequences. The latter are put together in chronological order. The color ones, though shown forward (except for the first one, which is shown in reverse), are ordered in reverse. Chronologically, the black-and-white sequences come first, the color sequences come next.

Using the numbering scheme suggested by Andy Klein—who took numbers from 1 to 22 for the black-and-white sequences and letters A–V for the color ones in his article for Salon magazine—the plotting of the film as presented is: Opening Credits (shown "backward"), 1, V, 2, U, 3, T, 4, S, ..., 22/A, Credits.

There is a smooth transition from the black-and-white sequence 22 to color sequence A, which occurs during the development of a Polaroid photograph.

The chronological order of the story can be viewed as a "hidden feature" on the 2-Disc Limited Edition Region 1 DVD and the 3-Disc special Edition Region 2 DVD. In this special feature, the chapters of the film are put together into the chronological order and is shown: Ending Credits (run in reverse), 1, 2, 3, ..., 22/A, B, ..., V, then the opening title runs "backward" to what was shown (the opening title sequence is run in reverse during the actual film, so it is shown forward in this version).

Stefano Ghislotti wrote an article in Film Anthology which discusses how Nolan provides the viewer with the clues necessary to decode the plot as we watch and help us understand the chronology. The color sequences include a brief overlap to help clue the audience into the fact that they are being presented in reverse order. The purpose of the fragmented reverse sequencing is to force the audience into a sympathetic experience of Leonard's defective ability to create new long-term memories, where prior events are not recalled, since the audience has yet to see them.

Production

Development
In July 1996, brothers Christopher and Jonathan Nolan took a cross-country road trip from Chicago to Los Angeles, as Christopher was relocating his home to the West Coast. During the drive, Jonathan pitched the story for the film to his brother, who responded enthusiastically to the idea. After they arrived in Los Angeles, Jonathan left for Washington, D.C., to finish college at Georgetown University. The mysterious killer character known only as "John G." was actually an homage to Jonathan's Georgetown University screenwriting professor at the time, John Glavin. Christopher repeatedly asked Jonathan to send him a first draft, and after a few months, Jonathan complied. Two months later, Christopher came up with the idea to tell the film backwards, and began to work on the screenplay. Jonathan wrote the short story simultaneously, and the brothers continued to correspond, sending each other subsequent revisions of their respective works. Christopher initially wrote the script as a linear story, and then would "go back and reorder it the way it is on screen to check the logic of it." Nolan was also influenced by the short story "Funes the Memorious" by Jorge Luis Borges. "I think Memento is a strange cousin to 'Funes the Memorious'—about a man who remembers everything, who can’t forget anything. It’s a bit of an inversion of that."

Jonathan's short story, titled "Memento Mori," is radically different from Christopher's film, although it maintains the same essential elements. In Jonathan's version, Leonard is instead named Earl and is a patient at a mental institution. As in the film, his wife was killed by an anonymous man, and during the attack on his wife, Earl lost his ability to create new long-term memories. Like Leonard, Earl leaves notes to himself and has tattoos with information about the killer. However, in the short story, Earl convinces himself through his own written notes to escape the mental institution and murder his wife's killer. Unlike the film, there is no ambiguity that Earl finds and kills the anonymous man.

In July 1997, Christopher Nolan's girlfriend (later wife) Emma Thomas showed his screenplay to Aaron Ryder, an executive for Newmarket Films. Ryder said the script was, "perhaps the most innovative script I had ever seen", and soon after, it was optioned by Newmarket and given a budget of $9 million. Pre-production lasted seven weeks, during which the main shooting location changed from Montreal, Quebec to Los Angeles, California, to create a more realistic and noirish atmosphere for the film.

Casting
Brad Pitt was initially slated to play Leonard. Pitt was interested in the part, but passed due to scheduling conflicts. Other considered actors included Charlie Sheen, Alec Baldwin, Aaron Eckhart (who would later work with Nolan on The Dark Knight) and Thomas Jane, but the role went to Guy Pearce, who impressed Nolan the most. Pearce was chosen partly for his "lack of celebrity" (after Pitt passed, they "decided to eschew the pursuit of A-list stars and make the film for less money by using an affordable quality actor"), and his enthusiasm for the role, evidenced by a personal phone call Pearce made to Nolan to discuss the part.

After being impressed by Carrie-Anne Moss's performance as Trinity in the 1999 science fiction film The Matrix, Jennifer Todd suggested her for the part of Natalie. While Mary McCormack lobbied for the role, Nolan decided to cast Moss as Natalie, saying, "She added an enormous amount to the role of Natalie that wasn't on the page". For the corrupt police officer Teddy, "comedian Denis Leary was mentioned, though proved unavailable". Moss suggested her co-star from The Matrix, Joe Pantoliano. Although there was a concern that Pantoliano might be too villainous for the part, he was still cast, and Nolan said he was surprised by the actor's subtlety in his performance.

The rest of the film's characters were quickly cast after the three main leads were established. Stephen Tobolowsky and Harriet Sansom Harris play Sammy Jankis and his wife, respectively. Mark Boone Junior landed the role of Burt, the motel clerk, because Jennifer Todd liked his "look and attitude" for the part (as a result he has re-appeared in minor roles in other productions by Nolan).

Filming
Filming took place from September 7 to October 8, 1999, a 25-day shooting schedule. Pearce was on set every day during filming, although all three principal actors (including Pantoliano and Moss) performed together only on the first day, shooting exterior sequences outside Natalie's house. All of Moss' scenes were completed in the first week, including follow-up scenes at Natalie's home, Ferdy's bar, and the restaurant where she meets Leonard for the final time.

Pantoliano returned to the set late in the second week to continue filming his scenes. On September 25, the crew shot the opening scene in which Leonard kills Teddy. Although the scene is in reverse motion, Nolan used forward-played sounds. For a shot of a shell casing flying upwards, the shell had to be dropped in front of the camera in forward motion, but it constantly rolled out of frame. Nolan was forced to blow the casing out of frame instead, but in the confusion, the crew shot it backwards. They then had to make an optical (a copy of the shot) and reverse the shot to make it go forward again. "That was the height of complexity in terms of the film", Nolan said. "An optical to make a backwards running shot forwards, and the forwards shot is a simulation of a backwards shot."

The next day, on September 26, Larry Holden returned to shoot the sequence where Leonard attacks Jimmy. After filming was completed five days later, Pearce's voice-overs were recorded. For the black-and-white scenes, Pearce was given free rein to improvise his narrative, allowing for a documentary feel.

The Travel Inn in Tujunga, California, was repainted and used as the interior of Leonard's and Dodd's motel rooms and the exterior of the film's Discount Inn. Scenes in Sammy Jankis' house were shot in a suburban home close to Pasadena, while Natalie's house was located in Burbank. The crew planned to shoot the derelict building set (where Leonard kills Teddy and Jimmy) in a Spanish-styled brick building owned by a train company. However, one week before shooting began, the company placed several dozen train carriages outside the building, making the exterior unfilmable. Since the interior of the building had already been built as a set, a new location had to be found. An oil refinery near Long Beach was used instead, and the scene where Leonard burns his wife's possessions was filmed on the other side of the refinery.

Music
David Julyan composed the film's synthesized score. Julyan acknowledges several synthesized soundtracks that inspired him, such as Vangelis's Blade Runner and Hans Zimmer's The Thin Red Line. While composing the score, Julyan created different, distinct sounds to differentiate between the color and black-and-white scenes: "brooding and classical" themes in the former, and "oppressive and rumbly noise" in the latter. Since he describes the entire score as "Leonard's theme", Julyan says, "The emotion I was aiming at with my music was yearning and loss. But a sense of loss you feel but at the same time you don't know what it is you have lost, a sense of being adrift." Initially, Nolan wanted to use Radiohead's "Paranoid Android" during the end credits, but he was unable to secure the rights. Instead, David Bowie's "Something in the Air" is used, although another of Radiohead's songs, an extended version of "Treefingers", is included on the film's soundtrack.

Release
The film gained substantial word-of-mouth press from the film festival circuit. It premiered at the 2000 Venice Film Festival, where it received a standing ovation, and afterwards played at Deauville American Film Festival and the Toronto International Film Festival. With the publicity from these events, Memento did not have trouble finding foreign distributors, opening in more than 20 countries worldwide. Its promotion tour ended at the Sundance Film Festival, where it played in January 2001.

Finding American distributors proved more troublesome. Memento was screened for various studio heads (including Miramax chief Harvey Weinstein) in March 2000. Although most of the executives loved the film and praised Nolan's talent, all passed on distributing the picture, believing it was too confusing and would not attract a large audience. After famed independent film director Steven Soderbergh saw the film and learned it was not being distributed, he championed the film in interviews and public events, giving it even more publicity, although he did not secure a distributor. Newmarket, in a financially risky move, decided to distribute the film itself. After the first few weeks of distribution, Memento had reached more than 500 theaters and earned a domestic total of $25 million in its box-office run. The film's success was surprising to those who passed on the film, so much so that Weinstein realized his mistake and tried to buy the film from Newmarket.

Marketing
Jonathan Nolan designed the film's official website. As with the marketing strategy of The Blair Witch Project, the website was intended to provide further clues and hints to introduce the story, while not providing any concrete information. After a short intro on the website, the viewer is shown a newspaper clipping detailing Leonard's murder of Teddy. Clicking on highlighted words in the article leads to more material describing the film, including Leonard's notes and photographs as well as police reports. The filmmakers employed another tactic by sending out Polaroid pictures to random people, depicting a bloody and shirtless Leonard pointing at an unmarked spot on his chest. Since Newmarket distributed the film themselves, Christopher Nolan edited the film's trailers himself. Sold to inexpensive cable-TV channels like Bravo and A&E, and websites such as Yahoo and MSN, the trailers were key to the film gaining widespread public notice.

Home media

Memento was released on DVD and VHS in the United States and Canada on September 4, 2001, and in the United Kingdom on January 14, 2002. The UK edition contains a hidden feature that allows the viewer to watch the film in chronological order. The Canadian version does not have this feature but the film chapters are set up to do this manually or through DVD programming. The original US release does not have the chronological feature nor are the chapters set up correctly to do it.

The film was later re-released in a limited edition DVD that features an audio commentary by Christopher Nolan, with four different endings; the original short story by Jonathan Nolan on which the film was based; and a Sundance Channel documentary on the making of the film. The limited edition DVD also contains a hidden feature that allows the viewer to watch the film in chronological order.

The Limited Edition DVD is packaged to look like Leonard's case file from a mental institution, with notes scribbled by "doctors" and Leonard on the inside. The DVD menus are designed as a series of psychological tests; the viewer has to choose certain words, objects, and multiple choice answers to play the movie or access special features. Leonard's "notes" on the DVD case offer clues to navigating the DVD. Some of the "materials" seem designed to induce paranoia and uncertainty (a picture of one person whispering to another is captioned, "They know what you did"), alluding to Shelby's mental state.

Memento was re-released in the UK on a 3-disc Special Edition DVD on December 27, 2004. This release contains all the special features that are on the two US releases in one package plus a couple of new interviews. The menus appear as tattoos on Leonard's body and are more straightforward than the US 2-disc limited edition DVD.

Memento was released on Blu-ray on August 15, 2006. This release lacks the special features contained on the Limited Edition DVD, but does include the audio commentary by director Christopher Nolan. The single-layer disc features an MPEG-2 1080p transfer and PCM 5.1 surround audio. The film was also released on iTunes as a digital download.

The film was re-released on the Blu-ray and DVD in the US on February 22, 2011, by Lionsgate following the 10th anniversary of the film. Both the Blu-ray and DVD have a new transfer that was also shown in theaters. Aside from the transfer, the Blu-ray contains a new special featurette by Nolan on the film's legacy.

Reception

Box office
Memento was a box office success. In the United States, during its opening weekend, it was released in only 11 theaters, but by week 11 it was distributed to more than 500 theaters. It grossed over $25 million in North America and $14 million in other countries, making the film's total worldwide gross some $40 million as of August 2007. During its theatrical run, it did not place higher than eighth in the list of highest-grossing movies for a single weekend.

Critical response
Memento was met with critical acclaim. On review aggregator Rotten Tomatoes, the film received an approval rating of 93% based on 179 reviews, with an average rating of 8.3/10. The site's critical consensus reads, "Christopher Nolan skillfully guides the audience through Memento fractured narrative, seeping his film in existential dread." On Metacritic, the film has a weighted average score of 81 out of 100 based on 34 critics, indicating "universal acclaim".

Film critic James Berardinelli gave the film four out of four stars, ranking it number one on his year-end Top Ten list and number sixty-three on his All-Time Top 100 films. In his review, he called it an "endlessly fascinating, wonderfully open-ended motion picture [that] will be remembered by many who see it as one of the best films of the year". Berardinelli praised the film's backwards narrative, saying that "what really distinguishes this film is its brilliant, innovative structure", and noted that Guy Pearce gives an "astounding ... tight, and thoroughly convincing performance". In 2009, Berardinelli chose Memento as his #3 best movie of the decade. William Arnold of the Seattle Post-Intelligencer writes that Memento is a "delicious one-time treat", and emphasizes that director Christopher Nolan "not only makes Memento work as a non-linear puzzle film, but as a tense, atmospheric thriller". Rob Blackwelder noted that "Nolan has a crackerjack command over the intricacies of this story. He makes every single element of the film a clue to the larger picture ... as the story edges back toward the origins of [Leonard's] quest".

Not all critics were impressed with the film's structure. Marjorie Baumgarten wrote, "In forward progression, the narrative would garner little interest, thus making the reverse storytelling a filmmaker's conceit." Sean Burns of the Philadelphia Weekly commented that "For all its formal wizardry, Memento is ultimately an ice-cold feat of intellectual gamesmanship. Once the visceral thrill of the puzzle structure begins to wear off, there's nothing left to hang onto. The film itself fades like one of Leonard's temporary memories." While Roger Ebert gave the film a favorable three out of four stars, he did not think it warranted multiple viewings. After watching Memento twice, he concluded that "Greater understanding helped on the plot level, but didn't enrich the viewing experience. Confusion is the state we are intended to be in." Jonathan Rosenbaum disliked the film, and commented in his review of Eternal Sunshine of the Spotless Mind that Memento is a "gimmicky and unpoetic counterfeit" of Alain Resnais's 1968 film Je t'aime, je t'aime.

In 2005, the Writers Guild of America ranked the screenplay #100 on its list of 101 Greatest Screenplays ever written. In 2012, the Motion Picture Editors Guild listed the film as the fourteenth best-edited film of all time based on a survey of its membership. Memento was considered "culturally, historically or aesthetically significant" by the US Library of Congress and was selected for preservation in the National Film Registry in 2017, the first narrative feature of the 2000s to be honored.

Scientific response
Many medical experts have cited Memento as featuring one of the most realistic and accurate depictions of anterograde amnesia. Caltech neuroscientist Christof Koch called Memento "the most accurate portrayal of the different memory systems in the popular media", while physician Esther M. Sternberg, Director of the Integrative Neural Immune Program at the National Institute of Mental Health, identified the film as "close to a perfect exploration of the neurobiology of memory."

Sternberg concludes: 

Clinical neuropsychologist Sallie Baxendale writes in The BMJ:

Interpretations and analysis

Since its release, Memento has been a widely noted topic of film discussion, both for its unique narrative structure and themes. Those searching for explanations of the film's plot have either resorted to online forums, message boards or scholarly material, or have ignored the film's official website and forums to maintain their own personal hypotheses. In an article for The Dissolve analyzing Nolan's work, Mike D'Angelo cites Memento as "a masterful study in deliberate self-delusion," alluding to Leonard's own actions towards the end of the film and his role as an unreliable narrator. On the same topic of self-deception, James Mooney of filmandphilosophy.com notes that the film suggests how "our memories deceive us, or rather, sometimes we deceive ourselves by 'choosing' to forget or by manipulating our memories of past events." This is much in line with a psychological analysis of the film, specifically the act of confabulation. Leonard's use of confabulation poses the dilemma, as explained by SUNY Downstate Medical Center Professor John Kubie for BrainFacts.org: "In Memento we are faced with the question of how much of Leonard's memory of the past is real and how much constructed from beliefs and wishes."

Author Chuck Klosterman has written in-depth about Memento in his essay collection Sex, Drugs, and Cocoa Puffs: A Low Culture Manifesto, specifically on the diner scene with Leonard and Natalie.

In an interview with Chuck Stephens for Filmmaker in 2001, Nolan also stated:

Best film list appearances

Awards and accolades
Because Jonathan Nolan's short story was not published before the film was released, it was nominated for Original Screenplay instead of Adapted Screenplay and both Christopher and Jonathan received a nomination.

Remake
AMBI Pictures announced in November 2015 that it plans to remake Memento, one of several film rights that AMBI acquired from its acquisition of Exclusive Media. Monika Bacardi, an executive for AMBI Pictures, stated that they plan to "stay true to Christopher Nolan's vision and deliver a memorable movie that is every bit as edgy, iconic and award-worthy as the original". As of April 2018, the film was still in the works.

See also 
 Reverse chronology
 "Memento Mori" (short story)
 Ghajini (2005 film)
 Ghajini (2008 film)

References

External links

 
 
 
 Official website
 Plot Holes: Memento, on how certain discrepancies might be plot holes or of more significance, on Slate
 Memento and anterograde amnesia

2000 crime thriller films
2000 films
2000 independent films
2000 psychological thriller films
2000s English-language films
2000s mystery thriller films
American crime thriller films
American films about revenge
American independent films
American mystery thriller films
American neo-noir films
American nonlinear narrative films
American psychological thriller films
Edgar Award-winning works
Fiction with unreliable narrators
Films about amnesia
Films about photography
Films about tattooing
Films based on short fiction
Films directed by Christopher Nolan
Films produced by Suzanne Todd
Films scored by David Julyan
Films set in Los Angeles
Films set in motels
Films shot from the first-person perspective
Films shot in Los Angeles
Films with screenplays by Christopher Nolan
Independent Spirit Award for Best Film winners
Newmarket films
Summit Entertainment films
Sundance Film Festival award winners
United States National Film Registry films
Uxoricide in fiction
2000s American films
Postmodern films
Films about disability